Prisoner in the Tower of Fire (also known as The Prisoner in the Fuoco Tower) is a 1953 Italian historical drama film written and directed by Giorgio W. Chili.

Plot 
15th century. Two young people belonging to families in conflict with each other form a strong friendship: their loyalty is severely tested when they fall in love with the same woman.

Cast 

Elisa Cegani as Bianca Maltivoglio
Milly Vitale as  Germana Della Valle
Ugo Sasso as  Cesco Di Maltivoglio
Carlo Giustini as  Marco Pepli
Attilio Dottesio as  Carlo Pepli
Nino Manfredi as  Stornello
Oscar Andriani as  Friar Anselmo
Cesare Fantoni as  Lorenzo Pepli
Carlo Ninchi as  Giovanni Sforza
Rossano Brazzi as  Cesare Borgia
Franco Pesce as  Pietro 
Memmo Carotenuto as  Raimondo 
Giulio Calì as  Giulio 
Ada Colangeli as  Ancella

References

External links

1953 films
1950s historical drama films
Italian historical drama films
Films scored by Carlo Rustichelli
Films set in the 1490s
1953 drama films
Italian black-and-white films
1950s Italian films